Conalcaea huachucana, the huachuca grasshopper, is a species of spur-throated grasshopper in the family Acrididae. It is found in North America.

Subspecies
These two subspecies belong to the species Conalcaea huachucana:
 Conalcaea huachucana coyoterae Hebard, 1922 i c g
 Conalcaea huachucana huachucana Rehn, 1907 i c g
Data sources: i = ITIS, c = Catalogue of Life, g = GBIF, b = Bugguide.net

References

Melanoplinae
Articles created by Qbugbot
Insects described in 1907